ER is an American medical drama television series created by novelist and physician Michael Crichton that aired on NBC from September 19, 1994, to April 2, 2009, with a total of 331 episodes spanning 15 seasons. It was produced by Constant C Productions and Amblin Television, in association with Warner Bros. Television. ER follows the inner life of the emergency room (ER) of Cook County General Hospital (a fictionalized version of the real Cook County Hospital) in Chicago, Illinois, and various critical issues faced by the department's physicians and staff.

The show is the second longest-running primetime medical drama in American television history behind Grey's Anatomy, and the sixth longest medical drama across the globe (behind the United Kingdom's Casualty and Holby City, Grey's Anatomy, Germany's In aller Freundschaft, and Poland's Na dobre i na złe). It won 23 Primetime Emmy Awards, including the 1996 Outstanding Drama Series award, and received 124 Emmy nominations. ER won 116 awards in total, including the Peabody Award, while the cast earned four Screen Actors Guild Awards for Outstanding Ensemble Performance in a Drama Series.

Production

Development

In 1974, author Michael Crichton wrote a screenplay based on his own experiences as a medical student in a busy hospital emergency room. The screenplay went nowhere and Crichton turned to other topics. In 1990, he published the novel Jurassic Park, and in 1993 began a collaboration with director Steven Spielberg on the film adaptation of the book. Crichton and Spielberg then turned to ER, but decided to film the story as a two-hour pilot for a television series rather than as a feature film. Spielberg's Amblin Entertainment provided John Wells as the show's executive producer.

The script used to shoot the pilot was virtually unchanged from what Crichton had written in 1974. The only substantive changes made by the producers in 1994 were that the Susan Lewis character became a woman and the Peter Benton character became African-American, and the running time was shortened by about 20 minutes in order for the pilot to air in a two-hour block on network TV. Because of a lack of time and money necessary to build a set, the pilot episode of ER was filmed in the former Linda Vista Hospital in Los Angeles, an old facility that had ceased operating in 1990. A set modeled after Los Angeles County General Hospital's emergency room was built soon afterward at the Warner Bros. studios in Burbank, California, although the show makes extensive use of location shoots in Chicago, most notably the city's famous "L" train platforms.

Warren Littlefield, running NBC Entertainment at the time, was impressed by the series: "We were intrigued, but we were admittedly a bit spooked in attempting to go back into that territory a few years after St. Elsewhere." With Spielberg attached behind the scenes, NBC ordered six episodes. "ER premiered opposite a Monday Night Football game on ABC and did surprisingly well. Then we moved it to Thursday and it just took off", commented Littlefield. ERs success surprised the networks and critics alike, as David E. Kelley's new medical drama Chicago Hope was expected to crush the new series.

Crichton remained executive producer until his death in November 2008, although he was still credited as one throughout that entire final season. Wells, the series' other initial executive producer, served as showrunner for the first three seasons. He was one of the show's most prolific writers and became a regular director in later years. Lydia Woodward was a part of the first season production team and became an executive producer for the third season. She took over as showrunner for the fourth season while Wells focused on the development of other series, including Trinity, Third Watch, and The West Wing. She left her executive producer position at the end of the sixth season but continued to write episodes throughout the series' run.

Joe Sachs, who was a writer and producer of the series, believed keeping a commitment to medical accuracy was extremely important: "We'd bend the rules but never break them. A medication that would take 10 minutes to work might take 30 seconds instead. We compressed time. A 12- to 24-hour shift gets pushed into 48 minutes. But we learned that being accurate was important for more reasons than just making real and responsible drama."

Woodward was replaced as showrunner by Jack Orman. Orman was recruited as a writer-producer for the series in its fourth season after a successful stint working on CBS's JAG. He was quickly promoted and became an executive producer and showrunner for the series' seventh season. He held these roles for three seasons before leaving the series at the end of the ninth season. Orman was also a frequent writer and directed three episodes of the show.

David Zabel served as the series' head writer and executive producer in its later seasons. He initially joined the crew for the eighth season and became an executive producer and showrunner for the twelfth season onward. Zabel was the series' most frequent writer, contributing to 41 episodes. He also made his directing debut on the series. Christopher Chulack was the series' most frequent director and worked as a producer on all 15 seasons. He became an executive producer in the fourth season but occasionally scaled back his involvement in later years to focus on other projects.

Other executive producers include writers Carol Flint, Neal Baer, R. Scott Gemmill, Dee Johnson, Joe Sachs, Lisa Zwerling, and Janine Sherman Barrois. Several of these writers and producers had background in healthcare: Joe Sachs was an emergency physician, while Lisa Zwerling and Neal Baer were both pediatricians. The series' crew was recognized with awards for writing, directing, producing, film editing, sound editing, casting, and music.

Broadcasting
Following the broadcast of its two-hour pilot movie on September 19, 1994, ER premiered Thursday, September 22 at 10pm. It remained in the same Thursday time slot for its entire run, capping the Must See TV primetime block. ER is NBC's third longest-running drama, after Law & Order and Law & Order: Special Victims Unit, and the second longest-running American primetime medical drama of all time, behind Grey's Anatomy. Starting with season seven, ER was broadcast in the 1080i HD format, appearing in letterbox format when presented in standard definition. On April 2, 2008, NBC announced that the series would return for its fifteenth season. The fifteenth season was originally scheduled to run for 19 episodes before retiring with a two-hour series finale to be broadcast on March 12, 2009, but NBC announced in January 2009 that it would extend the show by an additional three episodes to a full 22-episode order as part of a deal to launch a new series by John Wells titled Police, later retitled Southland. ERs final episode aired on April 2, 2009; the two-hour episode was preceded by a one-hour retrospective special. The series finale charged $425,000 per 30-second ad spot, more than three times the season's rate of $135,000. From season 4 to season 6 ER cost a record-breaking $13 million per episode. TNT also paid a record price of $1 million an episode for four years of repeats of the series during that time. The cost of the first three seasons was $2 million per episode and seasons 7 to 9 cost $8 million per episode.

In September 1998, TNT aired syndicated reruns of the series.

Cast and characters 

The original starring cast consisted of Anthony Edwards as Dr. Mark Greene, George Clooney as Dr. Doug Ross, Sherry Stringfield as Dr. Susan Lewis, Noah Wyle as medical student John Carter, and Eriq La Salle as Dr. Peter Benton. As the series continued, some key changes were made: Nurse Carol Hathaway, played by Julianna Margulies, who attempts suicide in the original pilot script, was made into a regular cast member. Ming-Na Wen debuted in the middle of the first season as medical student Jing-Mei "Deb" Chen, but did not return for the second season; she returns in season 6 episode 10. Gloria Reuben and Laura Innes would join the series as Physician Assistant Jeanie Boulet and Dr. Kerry Weaver, respectively, by the second season.

In the third season, a series of cast additions and departures began that would see the entire original cast leave over time. Stringfield was the first to exit the series, reportedly upsetting producers who believed she wanted to negotiate for more money, but the actress did not particularly care for "fame."
 She would return to the series from 2001 until 2005. Clooney departed the series in 1999 to pursue a film career, and Margulies exited the following year. Season eight saw the departure of La Salle and Edwards when Benton left County General and Greene died from a brain tumor. Wyle left the series after season 11 in order to spend more time with his family, but would return for two multiple-episode appearances in the show's final seasons. Goran Visnjic as Dr. Luka Kovač, Maura Tierney as Dr. Abby Lockhart, Alex Kingston as Dr. Elizabeth Corday, Paul McCrane as Dr. Robert Romano, and Mekhi Phifer as Dr. Greg Pratt all joined the cast as the seasons went on. In the much later seasons, the show would see the additions of Scott Grimes as Dr. Archie Morris, Parminder Nagra as Dr. Neela Rasgotra, Shane West as Dr. Ray Barnett, Linda Cardellini as nurse Samantha Taggart, John Stamos as intern Tony Gates, David Lyons as Dr. Simon Brenner and Angela Bassett as Dr. Catherine Banfield.

In addition to the main cast, ER featured a large number of frequently seen recurring cast members who played key roles such as paramedics, hospital support staff, nurses, and doctors. ER also featured a sizable roster of well-known guest stars, some making rare television appearances, who typically played patients in single episode appearances or multi-episode arcs.

Episodes 

A typical episode centered on the ER, with most scenes set in the hospital or surrounding streets. In addition, most seasons included at least one storyline located completely outside of the ER, often outside of Chicago. Over the span of the series, stories took place in the Democratic Republic of The Congo, France, Iraq and Sudan. One early storyline involved a road trip taken by Dr. Ross and Dr. Greene to California and a season eight episode included a storyline in Hawaii featuring Dr. Greene and Dr. Corday. Beginning in season nine, storylines started to include the Democratic Republic of the Congo, featuring Dr. Kovac, Dr. Carter, and Dr. Pratt. "We turned some attention on the Congo and on Darfur when nobody else was. We had a bigger audience than a nightly newscast will ever see, making 25 to 30 million people aware of what was going on in Africa," ER producer John Wells said. "The show is not about telling people to eat their vegetables, but if we can do that in an entertaining context, then there's nothing better." The series also focused on sociopolitical issues such as HIV and AIDS, organ transplants, mental illness, racism, human trafficking, euthanasia, poverty and gay rights.

Some episodes used creative formats, such as the 1997 "Ambush", which was broadcast live twice, once for the east coast and again three hours later for the west coast, and 2002's "Hindsight", which ran in reverse time as it followed one character, Dr. Kovac, through the events of a Christmas Eve shift and the Christmas party that preceded it.

Crossover with Third Watch 

The episode "Brothers and Sisters" (first broadcast on April 25, 2002) begins a crossover that concludes on the Third Watch episode "Unleashed" in which Dr. Lewis enlists the help of Officers Maurice Boscorelli and Faith Yokas to find her sister and niece.

Ratings
U.S. seasonal rankings based on average total viewers per episode of ER on NBC are tabulated below.  Each U.S. network television season starts in late September and ends in late May, which coincides with the completion of May sweeps. All times mentioned in this section were in the Eastern and Pacific time zones. Ratings for seasons 1–2 are listed in households (the percentage of households watching the program), while ratings for seasons 3–15 are listed in viewers.

In its first year, ER attracted an average of 19 million viewers per episode, becoming the year's second most watched television show, just behind Seinfeld. In the following two seasons (1995–1997), ER was the most watched show in North America. For almost five years, ER battled for the top spot against Seinfeld, but in 1998, Seinfeld ended and then ER became number one again. The series finale attracted 16.4 million viewers. The show's highest rating came during the season 2 episode "Hell and High Water," with 48 million viewers and a 45% market share. It was the highest for a regularly scheduled drama since a May 1985 installment of Dallas received a 46. The share represents the percentage of TVs in use tuned in to that show.

Critical reception

Throughout the series ER received positive reviews from critics and fans alike. It scored 80 on Metacritic, meaning "generally favorable reviews", based on 21 critics. Marvin Kitman from Newsday said: "It's like M*A*S*H with just the helicopters showing up and no laughs. E.R. is all trauma; you never get to know enough about the patients or get involved with them. It's just treat, release and move on". Richard Zoglin from Time stated that it's "probably the most realistic fictional treatment of the medical profession TV has ever presented".

Critical reactions for ERs first season were very favorable. Alan Rich, writing for Variety, praised the direction and editing of the pilot while Eric Mink, writing for the New York Daily News, said that the pilot of ER "was urban, emergency room chaos and young, committed doctors." However some reviewers felt the episodes following the pilot did not live up to it with Mink commenting that "the great promise of the "E.R." pilot dissolves into the kind of routine, predictable, sloppily detailed medical drama we've seen many times before."

NBC launched the show at the same time that CBS launched its own medical drama Chicago Hope; many critics drew comparisons between the two. Eric Mink concluded that ER may rate more highly in the Nielsens but Chicago Hope told better stories, while Rich felt both shows were "riveting, superior TV fare." The Daily Telegraph wrote in 1996: "Not being able to follow what on earth is going on remains one of the peculiar charms of the breakneck American hospital drama, ER".

In 2002, TV Guide ranked ER No. 22 on their list of "TV's Top 50 Shows", making it the second highest ranked medical drama on the list (after St. Elsewhere at No. 20). Also, the season 1 episode "Love's Labor Lost" was ranked No. 6 on TV Guides 100 Greatest Episodes of All-Time list having earlier been ranked No. 3. The show placed No. 19 on Entertainment Weekly "New TV Classics" list. British magazine Empire ranked it No. 29 in their list of the "50 Greatest TV Shows of All Time" and said the best episode was "Hell And High Water" (Season 2, Episode 7) where "Doug Ross (George Clooney) saves a young boy from drowning during a flood." In 2012, ER was voted Best TV Drama on ABC's 20/20 special episode "Best in TV: The Greatest TV Shows of Our Time". In 2013, TV Guide ranked it No. 9 in its list of The 60 Greatest Dramas of All Time and No. 29 in its list of the 60 Best Series. In the same year, the Writers Guild of America ranked ER No. 27 in its list of the 101 Best Written TV Series Of All Time.

Awards and nominations

The series

Distribution

Home media
Warner Home Video has released all 15 seasons in R1, R2, and R4.

In the UK (Region 2), The Complete Series boxset was released on October 26, 2009. On September 12, 2016 the series was re-released in three box sets, Seasons 1–5, Seasons 6–10 and Seasons 11–15.

The DVD box sets of ER are unusual in the fact that they are all in anamorphic widescreen even though the first six seasons of the show were broadcast in a standard 4:3 format. ER was shot protecting for widescreen presentation, allowing the show to be presented in 16:9 open matte (leaving only the title sequence in the 4:3 format). However, as the production of the show was generally conceived with 4:3 presentation in mind, some episodes feature vignetting or unintended objects towards the sides of the frame that would not be visible when presented in the 4:3 format. These episodes also appear in the widescreen format when rerun on TNT HD, Pop and streaming services.

In 2018 Hulu struck a deal with Warner Bros Domestic Television Distribution to stream all 15 seasons of the show. The show arrived on HBO Max in January 2022.

Soundtrack
In 1996, Atlantic Records released an album of music from the first two seasons, featuring James Newton Howard's theme from the series in its on-air and full versions, selections from the weekly scores composed by Martin Davich (Howard scored the two-hour pilot, Davich scored all the subsequent episodes and wrote a new theme used from 2006–2009 until the final episode, when Howard's original theme returned) and songs used on the series.

 Theme From ER – James Newton Howard (3:02)
 Dr. Lewis And Renee (from "The Birthday Party") (1:57)
 Canine Blues (from "Make of Two Hearts") (2:27)
 Goodbye Baby Susie (from "Fever of Unknown Origin") (3:11)
 Doug & Carol (from "The Gift") – composed by James Newton Howard and Martin Davich (1:59)
 Healing Hands – Marc Cohn (4:25)
 The Hero (from "Hell And High Water") composed by James Newton Howard and Martin Davich (1:55)
 Carter, See You Next Fall (from "Everything Old Is New Again") (1:28)
 Reasons For Living – Duncan Sheik (4:33)
 Dr. Green and a Mother's Death (from "Love's Labor Lost") (2:48)
 Raul Dies (from "The Healers") (2:20)
 Hell And High Water (from "Hell And High Water") – composed by James Newton Howard and Martin Davich (2:38)
 Hold On (from "Hell And High Water") (2:47)
 Shep Arrives (from "The Healers") (3:37)
 Shattered Glass (from "Hell And High Water") (2:11)
 Theme From ER – James Newton Howard  (1:00)
 It Came Upon A Midnight Clear – Mike Finnegan (2:30)

Other media
 An ER video game developed by Legacy Interactive for Windows 2000 and XP was released in 2005.
 In the Mad episode "Pokémon Park / WWER", the show was parodied in the style of WWE.
 A recurring sketch called "Toy ER" in the Nickelodeon comedy series All That parodies the show, featuring Dr. Malady (Chelsea Brummet), Dr. Botch (Giovonnie Samuels), and Dr. Sax (Shane Lyons) "treating" damaged toys.
 A book about emergency medicine based on the TV series, The Medicine of ER: An Insider's Guide to the Medical Science Behind America's #1 TV Drama was published in 1996. Authors Alan Duncan Ross and Harlan Gibbs M.D. have hospital administration and ER experience, respectively, and are called fans of the TV show in the book's credits.

Foreign adaptations
In March 2012, Warner Bros. International Television announced that they would sell the format rights to ER to overseas territories. This allowed foreign countries to produce their own version of the series.

In June 2013, Warner Bros. International Television and Emotion Production from Belgrade, Serbia, announced a Serbian version of ER. Urgentni Centar premiered on October 6, 2014, on TV Prva. As of 2014 a Colombian version was planned.

See also
 Casualty – Similar concept but based on a British fictional hospital's accident & emergency department.

References

External links

 ER's official Warner Bros. website
 ER's official NBC website
 
 

 
1994 American television series debuts
2009 American television series endings
1990s American medical television series
1990s American workplace drama television series
2000s American medical television series
2000s American workplace drama television series
English-language television shows
NBC original programming
Nielsen ratings winners
Peabody Award-winning television programs
Primetime Emmy Award for Outstanding Drama Series winners
Primetime Emmy Award-winning television series
Outstanding Performance by an Ensemble in a Drama Series Screen Actors Guild Award winners
Television series by Amblin Entertainment
Television series by Warner Bros. Television Studios
Television shows set in Chicago
Works by Michael Crichton